Julian Austin (born December 30, 1949 in Georgetown, British Guiana) is a former field hockey player from Canada, who was member of the Men's National Team that finished in tenth position at the 1984 Summer Olympics in Los Angeles, California.

Olympic career 
Austin represented Canada in the World Cup of Field Hockey, two Pan American Games, helping the national team to win a silver medal and their first gold medal in that sport. The gold medal performance qualified Canada for the Olympic Games in Los Angeles in 1984. His contributions to Canadian athletics has earned him two Sports Excellence Awards from the Government of Canada: one in 1983 presented by former Prime Minister Pierre Elliot Trudeau, and another in 1984 after the Olympics by former Prime Minister Brian Mulroney.

Personal life 
A policeman in his native Guyana before immigrating to Canada during the early 1970s, Austin has worked as a volunteer for his parish at in Scarborough. As a young person he sat on many committees helping the youth and the elders of the church In The Scarborough Rough River area, where he still lives, he served as a member of the Old Lansing Cut-off Ratepayers Association responsible for the community youth program.

Austin has a wife, Laurel, and is the father of a son and daughter. A former Vice-President, Assistant Welfare Officer of the Guyana Ex-Police Association of Canada, responsible for Fund raising and Event planning. His favourite saying is: "If I can help somebody as I pass along then my living would not be in vain."

Julian Joined the Malvern Onyx Lions Club in its Charter year, served as tail twister, membership director and eventually President, 2009-2010 2010 2011 also is providing the space for its Den. He is currently the Zone 58B chair and was elected the Region 58 chair at the 2015 Lions District A711 Convention.

Austin is a facilitator on the Global Leadership Team of the Lions Clubs International in his district.

International senior competitions

 1979 - Pan American Games, Puerto Rico (Silver)
 1983 - Pan American Games, Venezuela (Gold)

 1984 – Olympic Games, Los Angeles (10th)

References

External links
 

1949 births
Living people
Canadian male field hockey players
Field hockey players from Toronto
Field hockey players at the 1984 Summer Olympics
Guyanese emigrants to Canada
Naturalized citizens of Canada
Olympic field hockey players of Canada
Sportspeople from Georgetown, Guyana
Sportspeople from Scarborough, Toronto
Pan American Games medalists in field hockey
Pan American Games gold medalists for Canada
Pan American Games silver medalists for Canada
Field hockey players at the 1979 Pan American Games
Field hockey players at the 1983 Pan American Games
Medalists at the 1979 Pan American Games
Medalists at the 1983 Pan American Games